Neptis incongrua is a butterfly in the family Nymphalidae. It is found in Malawi, Zambia, the Democratic Republic of the Congo, Tanzania, Uganda and south-eastern Kenya. The habitat consists of sub-montane to montane forests.

The larvae feed on Wisteria sinensis and Dombeya species.

Subspecies
Neptis incongrua incongrua (Malawi, Zambia, southern and eastern Tanzania)
Neptis incongrua isidoro Kielland, 1985 (north-eastern Tanzania)
Neptis incongrua nguru Kielland, 1987 (eastern Tanzania)

References

Butterflies described in 1896
incongrua
Butterflies of Africa
Taxa named by Arthur Gardiner Butler